Belize will compete at the 2014 Summer Youth Olympics, in Nanjing, China from 16 August to 28 August 2014.

Athletics

Belize qualified one athlete.

Qualification Legend: Q=Final A (medal); qB=Final B (non-medal); qC=Final C (non-medal); qD=Final D (non-medal); qE=Final E (non-medal)

Girls
Track & road events

Cycling

Belize was given an invitation by the tripartite commission.

Team

Mixed Relay

References

2014 in Belizean sport
Nations at the 2014 Summer Youth Olympics
Belize at the Youth Olympics